Tint may refer to the following people:
Given name
Tint Hsan (born 1956), Burmese Minister for Sports
Tint Swe (disambiguation), multiple people

Surname
Francine Tint, American abstract expressionist painter and costume designer
Mya Than Tint (1929–1998), Burmese writer and translator

Burmese names